The Great War is a 26-episode documentary series from 1964 on the First World War. The documentary was a co-production of the Imperial War Museum, the British Broadcasting Corporation, the Canadian Broadcasting Corporation and the Australian Broadcasting Commission. The narrator was Michael Redgrave, with readings by Marius Goring, Ralph Richardson, Cyril Luckham, Sebastian Shaw and Emlyn Williams.

Production

In August 1963, at the suggestion of Alasdair Milne, producer of the BBC's current affairs programme Tonight, the BBC resolved to mark the fiftieth anniversary of the outbreak of the First World War with a big television project. The series was the first to feature veterans, many of them still relatively fit men in their late sixties or early seventies, speaking of their experiences after a public appeal for veterans was published in the national press. Those who appeared in the series included Edward Spears, Henry Williamson, Horace Birks, Benjamin Muse, Melvin Krulewitch, George Langley, Keith Officer, Douglas Wimberley, Charles Carrington, Egbert Cadbury, Euan Rabagliati, Robert Cotton Money, Richard Talbot Kelly, Norman Demuth, Walter Greenwood and Cecil Arthur Lewis. The small number of Germans who appeared included  Stephan Westmann and Gustav Lachmann. Others who were interviewed by the BBC but not featured in the series included Norman MacMillan, Mabel Lethbridge, Edgar von Spiegel, Edmund Blunden, Martin Niemöller, John Shea, Hans Howaldt, William Ibbett, Marthe Bibesco, Philip Joubert de la Ferté and Eric Dorman O'Gowan.

Title sequence
The series title sequence used a rostrum camera to create a montage of three images, the first showing a silhouetted British soldier standing over the grave of a comrade, the camera first focuses on the cross, where the almost imperceptible words IN MEMORY are glanced, the second shows a uniformed, skeletal corpse by the entrance to a dugout. The final image shows a lone Irish soldier, looking directly into the camera apparently surrounded by corpses, which is a montage of several images combined for dramatic effect. The original image of the staring soldier, showing him surrounded by fellow soldiers rather than corpses, was taken from photograph Q 1 in the Imperial War Museum photograph archive but has been described as having quickly become symbolic of the First World War. This title sequence was set against the series theme music, composed by Wilfred Josephs and performed by the BBC Northern Orchestra.

Episode listing
The episode titles are taken from quotations, the origins of which are shown in parentheses.  With few exceptions, successive blocks of episodes are devoted to each year of the war: episodes 1–6 to 1914, 7–10 to 1915, 11–14 to 1916, 15–19 to 1917, 20–23 and 26 to 1918.

Two "Extra" episodes exist on the dual-layer DVD edition:

 "Voices from the Western Front"
 "The Finished Fighter"

Musical score
The music for the series was composed by Wilfred Josephs. It was performed by the BBC Northern Symphony Orchestra conducted by George Hurst.  His expressive yet unsentimental score was widely acclaimed at the time and many have recalled the strong contribution it made to the series. In August 2007, Guardian columnist Ian Jack remembered how at the start of each episode Josephs' "ominous music ushered the audience into the trenches". Much use was made of 20th century symphonies, including Shostakovich's 11th Symphony and Vaughan Williams' Sinfonia Antartica'.

Reception
Each episode of The Great War was seen by an average audience of over eight million people, a 17 percent share of the estimated viewing population. The fourth episode, the most popular of the series, reached an audience of over eleven million (22.6 percent of the audience).

Awards
The programme won a Bafta Special Award in 1964. Following transmission of the series by the Republic of Ireland's national TV station, Telefís Éireann, The Great War won a Jacob's Award at the 1964 presentation ceremony in Dublin.

First World War centenary
On 16 October 2013, fifty years after the release of the series, the BBC announced that unshown interview material, recorded during the making of The Great War, will be used in a new programme, My Great War, to be shown as part of the BBC's programmes during the First World War centenary. The programme was first broadcast on 14 March 2014 and entitled "I Was There: the Great War Interviews".

DVD releases
There appear to be two releases as of mid-2007, both in the UK, both Region 2. The audio has been remastered. The first shows copyright 2001 and consists of five volumes, each housing two DVDs (single-layer).  On the cover descriptions there is no mention of the Extra episodes The other shows copyright 2002 and consists of seven DVDs – six containing the original 26 episodes and one with the two Extras.  These discs are dual-layer. It is distributed by DD Video.

See also
 World War One – CBS production (1964)
 The World at War – Thames Television production (1973)
 The First World War - Channel 4 production (2003)
 The Somme – From Defeat to Victory - BBC production (2006)

Notes

Footnotes

References

Books
 

Journals
 
 
 
 

Websites
 

Further reading

 
 
 
 

External links

 How the Great War Was Lost - and Found (The review wrongly implies the score for the series was either indebted to, or written by Sir William Walton, whom it also erroneously cites for the score of Scott of the Antarctic'', written by Ralph Vaughan Williams.)
 The Great War, Episode 6
 
 IWM Interview with Euan Rabagliati, who appeared in "We Must Hack Our Way Through"
 IWM Interview with Frederick Atkinson, who appeared in "Our Hats We Doff To General Joffre"
 IWM Interview with Ernest Amis, who appeared in "So Sleep Easy In Your Beds"
 IWM Interview with Joseph Murray, who appeared in "Please God Send Us A Victory"
 IWM Interview with Richard Talbot Kelly, who appeared in "What Are Our Allies Doing?" & "Surely We Have Perished"
 IWM Interview with Horace Birks, who appeared in "The Hell Where Youth And Laughter Go"
 IWM Interview with Herbert Sulzbach, who appeared in "And We Were Young"

Jacob's Award winners
1964 British television series debuts
1964 British television series endings
1960s British documentary television series
British documentary television series
Documentary films about World War I
Documentary television series about World War I
Cultural depictions of Gavrilo Princip
Cultural depictions of Archduke Franz Ferdinand of Austria
BBC television documentaries about history during the 20th Century
BAFTA winners (television series)